Thomas Berger may refer to:

 Thomas Berger (novelist) (1924–2014), American author 
 Thomas R. Berger (1933–2021), Canadian lawyer and jurist

See also
Thomas François Burgers (1834–1881), 4th president of the South African Republic